The Hippopotamus (hieroglyph) is Gardiner sign listed no. E25, in the category of mammals. It is used in Egyptian hieroglyphs as a determinative in words designating the animal, in Egyptian as db, and kh3b.

The hieroglyph shows the massiveness of the hippo's body, on its short legs. In Late Period Egypt, it was also used for words related to "heavy" (namely dns, udn-(wdn).

Palermo Stone usage, 2392 BC
On the Palermo piece-(obverse) of the 7-piece Palermo Stone of the 24th to 23rd century BC, it can be found in a year-register claiming the King (pharaoh) went on a hippopotamus hunt using  "hide with arrow" (F29), F29

See also

Gardiner's Sign List#E. Mammals

References

Betrò, 1995. Hieroglyphics: The Writings of Ancient Egypt, Betrò, Maria Carmela, c. 1995, 1996-(English), Abbeville Press Publishers, New York, London, Paris (hardcover)-->
Budge.  An Egyptian Hieroglyphic Dictionary, E.A.Wallace Budge, (Dover Publications), c 1978, (c 1920), Dover edition, 1978. (In two volumes, 1314 pp. and cliv-(154) pp.) (softcover)

Egyptian hieroglyphs: mammals